Hacket is a surname. Notable people with the surname include:

Cuthbert Hacket (died 1631), English merchant
George Hacket (or Halket) (died 1756), Scottish poet and songwriter
John Hacket (1592–1670), English churchman
William Hacket (or Hackett) (died 1591), English puritan and religious fanatic

See also
Hackett (surname)